Protect Me may refer to:

 "Protect Me" a song by James from Seven, 1992
 "Protecting Me" a song by Aly & AJ from Into the Rush, 2006
 "Protège-Moi", a song by Placebo, 2004

 "Protect-Me", a cyber-security and Data-analysis company